Prince Ferdinando of Savoy, 1st Duke of Genoa (Ferdinando Maria Alberto Amedeo Filiberto Vincenzo; 15 November 1822 – 10 February 1855) was the founder of the Genoa branch of the House of Savoy.

Biography

Prince Ferdinando was born in Florence the second son of Charles Albert, Prince of Carignano and Maria Theresa of Austria. His father was the head of the House of Savoy-Carignano a cadet branch of the House of Savoy. The senior line of the house became extinct in 1831 and his father succeeded as King of Sardinia. With the ascension of his father he was created Duke of Genoa.

During the wars taking place on the Italian Peninsula in 1848 and 1849, Prince Ferdinando commanded an army division. After peace was restored in Italy he was appointed general commandment of the artillery and set about making improvements.

As a result of the Sicilian revolution of independence he was a candidate for the throne. He was the most acceptable candidate to Britain and the British Minister in Turin informed him they would recognise him as king as soon as he took possession of the throne. On 11 July 1848 the national assembly of Sicily unanimously voted to offer him the throne. When the Sicilian deputation arrived to offer him the throne, he was absent from Royal headquarters as he was commanding a division in the army. After Sardinia's defeat by the forces of the Austrian Empire commanded by Joseph Radetzky von Radetz he felt compelled to decline the opportunity to become King of Sicily.

During the Crimean war he was to be appointed to command the Kingdom of Sardinia's auxiliary corps but his declining health meant he could not take up the posting.

His health did not recover and he died in Turin at the age thirty two. He is buried in the Royal Crypt of the Basilica of Superga. His one-year-old son Thomas succeeded to the title Duke of Genoa.

Marriage and children
Prince Ferdinando married Princess Elisabeth of Saxony, daughter of King John of Saxony and Princess Amalie of Bavaria, on 22 April 1850 in Dresden. They had two children:

Princess Margherita of Savoy-Genoa (20 November 1851, Palazzo Chiablese – 4 January 1926, Bordighera); married Umberto I of Italy and had issue.
Prince Tommaso, 2nd Duke of Genoa (6 February 1854, Palazzo Chiablese – 15 April 1931, Turin); married Princess Isabella of Bavaria and had issue.

Ancestry

References

1822 births
1855 deaths
Nobility from Florence
People of the First Italian War of Independence
Italian people of Polish descent
Princes of Savoy
Dukes of Genoa
Italian royalty
Burials at the Basilica of Superga
Military personnel from Florence
Sons of kings